Radulphius is a genus of spiders in the family Cheiracanthiidae. It was first described in 1891 by Keyserling. , it contains 15 species, all from Brazil.

Species
Radulphius comprises the following species:
Radulphius barueri Bonaldo & Buckup, 1995
Radulphius bicolor Keyserling, 1891
Radulphius bidentatus Bonaldo & Buckup, 1995
Radulphius boraceia Bonaldo & Buckup, 1995
Radulphius caldas Bonaldo & Buckup, 1995
Radulphius camacan Bonaldo, 1994
Radulphius cambara Bonaldo & Buckup, 1995
Radulphius caparao Bonaldo & Buckup, 1995
Radulphius lane Bonaldo & Buckup, 1995
Radulphius laticeps Keyserling, 1891
Radulphius latus Bonaldo & Buckup, 1995
Radulphius monticola (Roewer, 1951)
Radulphius petropolis Bonaldo & Buckup, 1995
Radulphius pintodarochai Bonaldo & Buckup, 1995
Radulphius singularis Bonaldo & Buckup, 1995

References

Cheiracanthiidae
Araneomorphae genera
Spiders of Brazil
Taxa named by Eugen von Keyserling